Marycrest Girls High School was an all female high school located at 5320 Federal Boulevard in Denver, Colorado, United States. The school was a private Roman Catholic institution.

History
The Sisters of St. Francis of Penance and Christian Charity purchased property near 52nd Avenue and Federal Boulevard in northwest Denver to house a convent and motherhouse for their order's new midwestern province in 1938. They christened the property Marycrest. The sisters converted their novitiate into Marycrest High School in 1958. The school's enrollment peaked around 200 in the 1970s, when it was known as a female counterpart to nearby Regis Jesuit High School. The school closed in 1988.

Following the school's closure, its campus was leased to Tennyson Center for Children with an option for that organization to purchase the property. In 1996, the building was demolished and replaced with assisted living residences.

Notable alumnae
Katherine Ann Power '67, bank robber
Heather Coogan, first female police chief of Littleton, Colorado

References

External links
Marycrest Assisted Living

High schools in Denver
Defunct schools in Colorado
Educational institutions established in 1958
Defunct girls' schools in the United States
Educational institutions disestablished in 1988
1958 establishments in Colorado
History of women in Colorado